Raymond Werner (c. 1935 – May 17, 1998) was the third on the Alberta Avenue CC curling team (from Edmonton, Alberta, Canada) during the World Curling Championships known as the 1961 Scotch Cup. He died in 1998.

References

External links

People from Fort Saskatchewan
Curlers from Edmonton
Brier champions
World curling champions
1998 deaths
Year of birth uncertain
Canadian male curlers